Brisco or Birksceugh is a village in the civil parish of St Cuthbert Without, in the Carlisle district, in the county of Cumbria, England. It is located a few miles south of the city of Carlisle, near Junction 42 of the M6 motorway. There is St Ninian's well in the village. In the Imperial Gazetteer of England and Wales of 1870-72 the township had a population of 323.

History 
The name "Brisco" means "wood of the (Strathclyde) Britons", Brisco was recorded as "Brethesco" in the 1203 Pipe Rolls. The village is one of the possible sources of the surname Brisco. Brisco railway station served the village.

See also

Listed buildings in St Cuthbert Without

References

External links 
 Cumbria County History Trust: Carlisle : St. Cuthbert Without (nb: provisional research only – see Talk page)

Villages in Cumbria
City of Carlisle